The Empire Rugby Football Union Geographical Union ("Empire GU") is the governing body for over 100 men's and women's rugby union clubs and colleges in New York State, Northern New Jersey and Southern Connecticut.

History

Formation
The Empire GU was created in July 2012 as a result of the merger of three governing bodies in the Northeastern United States: Northeast Rugby Union, New York State Rugby Conference (NYSRC) and Metropolitan New York Rugby Union (METNYRFU). When formed, Empire GU was one of four pilot Geographical Unions that have been developed by USA Rugby, and the first in the country to have been created by merging multiple former unions. The creation of these new GUs was carried out with the intention of creating a "more streamlined structure, effectively support growth in the game and provide increased member services in local areas". As of 2013, the GU structure ceased to be seen as a pilot program, being fully adopted as the local governance model for Club Rugby moving forward.

Structure
Empire GU comprises teams from New York State, Northern New Jersey and southern Connecticut. Some college teams are also included in the union. The GU encompasses the former Northeast Rugby Union, a Territorial Union (TU), and two former Local Area Unions (LAUs): New York State Rugby Conference (NYSRC) and Metropolitan New York Rugby Union (METNYRFU).

Upon creation of the Empire GU, NRU, NYSRC and METNYRFU were all dissolved. The last remaining member of the former NRU, New England Rugby Football Union (NERFU), was not absorbed into the new union, instead becoming a separate GU in its own right. Some NERFU teams, however, continue to compete in Empire GU's league system, namely in the Senior Men's D1, and the Senior Women's D1, D2 and D3.

Clubs

Senior Men

Senior Women

* denotes a team that is a member of NERFU, not Empire GU

See also
 Rugby union in the United States

References

External links
 Official website
 USA Rugby Official Site
 IRB Official Site

Rugby union governing bodies in the United States